Serge Kanyinda is an actor from the Democratic Republic of the Congo, best known for his performance as Magicien in the 2012 film War Witch (Rebelle). He has albinism.

Kanyinda won the Canadian Screen Award for Best Supporting Actor at the 1st Canadian Screen Awards.

References

External links

Democratic Republic of the Congo male actors
Living people
People with albinism
Best Supporting Actor Genie and Canadian Screen Award winners
Year of birth missing (living people)
Best Supporting Actor Jutra and Iris Award winners